Previous: List of United Kingdom Parliament constituencies (1801–1832)
 Alternative list: List of United Kingdom Parliament constituencies (1832–1868)

South West England (96)

Cornwall (14 then 13)

Devon (22)

Somerset (13)

Dorset (14)

Gloucestershire (15)

Wiltshire (18)

South East England (109)

Buckinghamshire (11)

Oxfordshire (9)

Berkshire (9)

Hampshire (19)

Surrey (11)

Sussex (18)

Kent (18)

Middlesex (14)

East Anglia (55)

Bedfordshire (4)

Hertfordshire (7)

Huntingdonshire (4)

Cambridgeshire (7)

Norfolk (12)

Suffolk (11)

Essex (10)

West Midlands (58)

Herefordshire (7)

Worcestershire (12)

Warwickshire (10)

Shropshire (12)

Staffordshire (17)

East Midlands (45)

Derbyshire (6)

Nottinghamshire (10)

Lincolnshire (13)

Leicestershire (6)

Rutland (2)

Northamptonshire (8)

North West England (48)

Cheshire (10)

Lancashire (26)

Cumberland (9)

Westmorland (3)

Yorkshire (37)

York (2)

Yorkshire, North Riding (11)

Yorkshire, West Riding (18)

Yorkshire, East Riding (6)

North East England (20)

Northumberland (10)

Durham (10)

Wales (32)

Anglesey (2)

Caernarvonshire (2)

Denbighshire (3)

Flintshire (2)

Merionethshire (1)

Montgomeryshire (2)

Cardiganshire (2)

Pembrokeshire (3)

Carmarthenshire (3)

Radnorshire (2)

Breconshire (2)

Glamorganshire (5)

Monmouthshire (3)

Scotland (53)

Orkney and Shetland (1)

Caithness (2)

Sutherland (1)

Ross and Cromarty (1)

Invernessshire (2)

Banffshire (1)

Elginshire and Nairnshire (2)

Aberdeenshire (2)

Kincardineshire (1)

Forfarshire (3)

Perthshire (2)

Clackmannanshire and Kinrossshire (1)

Fife (3)

Argyllshire (1)

Dunbartonshire (1)

Renfrewshire (3)

Stirlingshire (3)

Ayrshire (3)

Buteshire (1)

Lanarkshire (3)

Linlithgowshire (1)

Midlothian (4)

Haddingtonshire (2)

Dumfriesshire (2)

Wigtownshire (2)

Kirkcudbright Stewartry (1)

Peeblesshire (1)

Selkirkshire (1)

Roxburghshire (1)

Berwickshire (1)

Ulster (29)

Antrim (6)

Londonderry (4)

Tyrone (3)

Armagh (4)

Down (3)

Fermanagh (3)

Donegal (2)

Monaghan (2)

Cavan (2)

Connacht (14)

Galway (4)

Leitrim (2)

Roscommon (3)

Sligo (3)

Mayo (2)

Leinster (35)

Longford (2)

Louth (4)

King's County (2)

Queen's County (3)

Meath (2)

Westmeath (2)

Carlow (3)

Dublin (6)

Wicklow (2)

Kildare (2)

Kilkenny (3)

Wexford (4)

Munster (29)

Clare (3)

Tipperary (4)

Limerick (4)

Kerry (3)

Cork (8)

Waterford (5)

See also 

1832